The 2018 Meeting de Paris was the 24th edition of the annual outdoor track and field meeting in Paris, France. Held on 30 June 2018 at the Stade Sébastien Charléty, it was the seventh leg of the 2018 IAAF Diamond League – the highest level international track and field circuit.

Seven world-leading performances were set, including Qatari Abderrahman Samba's Asian record time of 46.98 seconds in the men's 400 metres hurdles and Caster Semenya's 1:54.25 minutes for the women's 800 metres. Both these were meeting records, as were Mariya Lasitskene's 2.04 m in the women's high jump and Sandra Perković's 68.60 m in the women's discus throw. Bahrain's Salwa Eid Naser also set an Asian record to win the women's 400 metres, with 49.55.

Results

Men

Women

References

External links
Official Diamond League Meeting de Paris website

2018
Paris
June 2018 sports events in France
Meeting de Paris
Meeting de Paris